Sasha P (born Anthonia Yetunde Alabi on 21 May 1983), also known as the "First Lady of Nigerian Hip Hop", is a Nigerian rapper, musician, businesswoman, lawyer, and motivational speaker.

Early life and education
The last of eight children, she was raised by her single mother, an educator, whom she fondly called Sisi Fadekemi, after her father died.
She began her musical career as a child in Ibadan.
She attended the International School Ibadan and the University of Lagos earning a bachelor's degree in Law.

Music career

Sasha P gained success at a time when there were very few Nigerian women in Hip Hop music. Subsequently, her success helped pave the way for other female rappers and musicians in Nigerian hip hop. She began musical collaborations and was signed on to eLDee's Trybe records. Sasha P has remained one of the most prominent female artists in Nigeria since 2001, especially after the successful release of her debut album First Lady under her record label STORM. She has been nominated for various awards in Nigeria and abroad.
She won the 2009 "Best Female Artist" award in the UK at the Women in Entertainment Awards for her first single titled "Adara". She was also nominated in dual categories (Best Female Video and Best Cinematography) by the SoundCity Video Music Awards for her second single Only One in 2009.

She was the first ever Nigerian female artist to perform at the 20th anniversary of the World Music Awards in October 2008. She was also the first Nigerian female artiste to win the Best Female Award at MTV Africa Music Awards (MAMA). Besides Adara, She released Gidi Babe on her birthday in 2009. She released a single in 2012 titled Bad Girl P.

In 2013, Sasha P revealed that she was taking a break from the music scene to focus on her fashion business.

Endorsements
Sasha P was endorse as a brand ambassador for Etisalat. She is also a cultural ambassador for her home state, Ekiti.

Fashion business
Sasha P pursued fashion as a bespoke designer in 2004. She created Nigerian high street fashion in December 2011 at L'Espace. In August 2012 she launched her own clothing label, Eclectic by Sasha, designed by herself.

Humanitarian work
In regard to community service, Sasha P said, "I believe as an individual, I have a social responsibility to make a difference any way I can", and this she has done consistently over the years. She was part of the "Save a street child" campaign in Lagos (January 2009) and the "Maternal Mortality" project (May 2009) which aims to educate and help cater to the needs of young mothers who seek adequate medical care. She is also a motivational speaker and has worked with a campaign to end violence against women.
In 2012, Sasha P was the Olympic torch bearer for Nigeria.

Discography
First Lady (2006)
Gidi Babe (2009)

Singles
Oya (2002)
Work it (2002)
Emi Le Gan (2003)
Adara (2008)
Only One (2009)
Bad Girl P (2012)
Falling in Love (2014)

Awards and nominations

Amen Awards

!Ref
|-
|2004
|Sasha for "Emi Le Gan"
|Best Upcoming Artiste
|
|

Women in Entertainment Video Awards

!Ref
|-
|2009
|Sasha for "Adara"
|Best Female Artiste
|
|rowspan=2|

Channel O Music Video Awards

!Ref
|-
|2009
|"Only One'
|Best Female Video
|
|

Kora Awards

!Ref
|-
|2010
|Herself
|Best Hip Hop Act in Africa
|
|

MTV Africa Music Awards

!Ref
|-
|2010
|Herself
|Best Female Artiste
|
|

Sound City Music Video Awards

!Ref
|-
|rowspan=2|2009
|rowspan=2|"Only One"
|Best Female Video
|
|rowspan=2|
|-
|Best Cinematography
|

References

External links

Nigerian women rappers
1983 births
University of Lagos alumni
Musicians from Ibadan
International School, Ibadan alumni
Nigerian fashion businesspeople
21st-century Nigerian women singers
21st-century Nigerian businesswomen
21st-century Nigerian businesspeople
Living people
English-language singers from Nigeria
Businesspeople from Ibadan
Women hip hop musicians
Nigerian women lawyers
Nigerian motivational speakers
Musicians from Lagos
Nigerian women fashion designers